Darwin is a 1920 German silent film directed by Fritz Bernhardt and starring Alf Blütecher, Ria Jende and Lya Sellin.

Cast
 Alf Blütecher as Magnus Tibour  
 Ria Jende as Helga Hilbing  
 Lya Sellin as Marthe Blan 
 Allan Durant as Axel Blan  
 Madge Jackson as Winawa 
 Wilhelmi as Professor

References

Bibliography
 Noah William Isenberg. Weimar Cinema: An Essential Guide to Classic Films of the Era. Columbia University Press, 2009.

External links

1920 films
Films of the Weimar Republic
German silent feature films
German black-and-white films